WGRN (89.5 FM) is a radio station licensed to serve the community of Greenville, Illinois. The station is owned by Greenville University Educational Broadcasting Foundation, Inc, and airs a contemporary Christian format.

The station was assigned the WGRN call letters by the Federal Communications Commission on January 26, 1965.

References

External links
 Official Website
 

GRN
Radio stations established in 1965
1965 establishments in Illinois
Contemporary Christian radio stations in the United States
Bond County, Illinois
GRN